Robert Perret (born 4 May 1946) is a sailor from Switzerland, who represented his country at the 1980 Summer Olympics in Tallinn as crew member in the Soling. With helmsman Jean-François Corminboeuf and fellow crew member Roger-Claude Guignard they took the 7th place.

References

Living people
1946 births
Sailors at the 1980 Summer Olympics – Soling
Olympic sailors of Switzerland
Swiss male sailors (sport)
20th-century Swiss people